Amblyptilia deprivatalis is a moth of the family Pterophoridae. This species was first described by Frances Walker in 1864. It is endemic to New Zealand and is found in the North and South Islands. Adults are on the wing from October to May and have an affinity to species in the genus Senecio.

Taxonomy 
This species was first described by Frances Walker in 1864 using specimens collected in Auckland by D. Bolton and named Pterophorus deprivatalis. In 1913 Edward Meyrick discussed this species under the name Platyptilia deprivatalis. In 1928 George Hudson discussing and illustrating this species in his 1928 publication The butterflies and moths of New Zealand using this name. In 1988 John S. Dugdale discussed this species also under the name Platyptilia deprivatalis. In 1993 Cees Gielis placed this species within the genus Amblyptilia. This placement was followed in 2010 in the New Zealand Inventory of Biodiversity. The male lectotype is held at the Natural History Museum, London.

Description 

Walker described this species as follows:

Hudson described this species as follows:
Hudson was of the opinion that the appearance of this species evolved for protective purposes when the adults of the species rest against the lichen Usnea barbata. Hudson argued that when at rest on this plant with its hindwings hidden beneath its extended forewings, the adults of A. deprivatalis are almost completely concealed. Hudson stated the markings on the forewings, body and legs fit the general appearance of U. barbata.

Distribution 
This species is endemic to New Zealand. Along with the type locality, this species has been observed in the Coromandel, Ohakune, the Mount Arthur tableland, Mount Cook, Ben Lomond, Lake Wakatipu, and Invercargill at altitudes from around 1250 m down to sea level. Hudson regarded it as a rare and local species.

Behaviour 
Adults of this species are on the wing from October until May.

Hosts 
The adults of this species appear to be attracted to species in the genus Senecio.

Reference

Moths described in 1864
Amblyptilia
Moths of New Zealand
Endemic fauna of New Zealand
Taxa named by Francis Walker (entomologist)
Endemic moths of New Zealand